American Camp is a village located in Rampur Union, Parbatipur Upazila, Dinajpur District in the division of Rangpur, Bangladesh.

Demographics 
The population is about 1135. Male 573 and female 562.

Urbanization 

About 40% of the population in the village does not have mains electricity supply. There is a Mosque named "American Camp Jame Mosajida"and also have an "Eidgah Moydan". There is a  big play ground. There are five ponds around the village on the west side of American Camp have a bypass road which is connect with Sorkar Para. American camp is Under 3 number Rampur union and 2 number ward.

Van, bicycle, and motorcycle are the main forms of transportation used within the village.

Water system 
Tube well water is used.

Education 

There are no government primary schools and have an BRAC school in American camp. Literacy rates have been increasing with time (male 40%, female 30%). The school drop-out rate is very disappointing.

See also 
 List of villages in Bangladesh

References

External links
 Parbatipur Union Government website
 DC Dinajpur Government Website

Populated places in Rangpur Division
Villages in Rangpur Division
Villages in Dinajpur District, Bangladesh
Parbatipur Upazila